Augustine Stow, J.P.,  (3 August 1833 – 29 May 1903) was a politician in colonial South Australia, member of the South Australian House of Assembly for West Torrens from November 1862 to 1864, and for Flinders from October 1866 to 1868.

Stow was born in Halstead, Essex, England, the son of the Rev. Thomas Quentin Stow and his wife Elizabeth, née Eppes; Augustine was the brother of Randolph Isham Stow and Jefferson Pickman Stow. The family arrived in South Australia in the Hartley  in 1837. He married Elizabeth Augusta Frew on 10 September 1867. On 19 March 1869, Stow was elected to the South Australian Legislative Council (in the days when all members were voted in by the whole colony, "The Province"), resigning in September 1871. Stow was Chief Secretary in Henry Strangways' Ministry for 18 days in May 1870. In 1877 he entered the Government service, and in April 1884 was appointed Registrar of Probates, and Chief Clerk in the Supreme Court. He was also Commissioner of Inland Revenue without salary.

Stow was a member of the board of governors of the Art Gallery, Public Library and Museum. Stow died on 29 May 1903 at Unley, Adelaide, South Australia.

References

|-

|-

|-

|-

1833 births
1903 deaths
Members of the South Australian House of Assembly
Members of the South Australian Legislative Council
People from Halstead
English emigrants to colonial Australia
19th-century Australian politicians
19th-century Australian public servants